The GMD GMDH-1 was an experimental diesel-hydraulic, center-cab,  switching locomotive built by General Motors Diesel of Canada.  Four examples were built.  The first two locomotives were each fitted with a pair of 6-cylinder Detroit Diesel series 110 engines giving , while the second pair had two series 71 engines developing .

The first constructed, in December 1956, was serial #A1597, numbered GMDD 1001.
It became the GMD London, Ontario plant switcher in April 1958, and was retired in November 1975.  The locomotive was given to the Canadian Railway Historical Association in July 1977, and passed into the collection of the Canada Science and Technology Museum in November 1986 after being restored by Al Howlett of London, Ontario.

The second locomotive, serial #A1713, was completed in September 1958, and was first numbered GMDD 600 as a demonstrator.   It was later sold to Brazil, where it was RFFSA 600 and later Rio Grande do Sul 6031.
The unit is reported as having been subsequently scrapped.

The third and fourth locomotives, #A1811 and #A1812, were constructed in September and October 1959 respectively; they were initially given GMDD 800 and 801.  Both were sold to industry.  #A1811 passed through a succession of owners.
It was first sold to Electric Reduction Company (ERCO) in May 1961 as their #89; ERC sold it to S.G. Paikin through Malcolm Black Equipment Ltd, equipment dealers, in October 1972, who in turn sold it to Limestone Products in October 1973 as their #3-6902.  It was sold once more to Malcolm Black Equipment Ltd in September 1979, who resold it in February 1980 to Raritan River Steel of (Perth Amboy, New Jersey) as their #3.  It didn't last there, returning to Canada again through Malcolm Black Equipment Ltd and being rebuilt by Peacock Bros. of Edmonton before passing in January 1981 to Hudson Bay Oil & Gas in Kaybob, Alberta as their #3.
Hudson Oil & Gas became Dome Petroleum and then Amoco Canada Petroleum, for whom the locomotive remains operable.

#A1812, meanwhile, was purchased by contracting firm Guy F. Atkinson Company as their #28151.
It was re-gauged to  gauge and shipped to Pakistan for the building of the Mangla Dam, where it still resides.

See also 
List of GMD Locomotives

References

GMDH-1
B-B locomotives
Experimental locomotives
Diesel locomotives of Canada
Diesel locomotives of Brazil
Diesel locomotives of Pakistan
Preserved diesel locomotives
Railway locomotives introduced in 1956
Standard gauge locomotives of Canada
5 ft 6 in gauge locomotives
Diesel-hydraulic locomotives
B′B′ locomotives